St John's RC School is a Roman Catholic special school located in Essex, England. The school is located south of Chigwell in the Epping Forest District of Essex, but is closer to Woodford Green in the London Borough of Redbridge.
 
The school educates pupils aged 5 to 19 years old who have moderate to severe learning difficulties, including communication difficulties and autism. According to Ofsted the school has 99 students on roll.

The school is not to be confused with either of the two other secondary schools in Essex also called St Johns: 
 St John's School (an independent school), Billericay 
 Epping St John's School, Epping

References

External links
 St John's RC School official website

Special schools in Essex
Roman Catholic private schools in the Diocese of Brentwood
Private schools in Essex
Buildings and structures in Chigwell